Sangar-e Sofla (also Romanized as Sangar-e Soflá; also known as Sangar, Sangar-e Pā’īn, and Sangar Pā’īn) is a village in Bakesh-e Yek Rural District, in the Central District of Mamasani County, Fars Province, Iran. At the 2006 census, its population was 253, in 51 families.

References 

Populated places in Mamasani County